An oil war is a conflict about petroleum resources, or their transportation, consumption, or regulation. The term may also refer generally to any conflict in a region that contains oil reserves or is geographically positioned in a location where an entity has or may wish to develop production or transportation infrastructure for petroleum products. It is also used to refer to any of a number of specific oil wars.

Research by Emily Meierding has characterized oil wars as largely a myth. She argues that proponents of oil wars underestimate the ability to seize and exploit foreign oil fields, and thus exaggerate the value of oil wars. She has examined four cases commonly described as oil wars (Japan's attack on the Dutch East Indies in World War II, Iraq's invasion of Kuwait, the Iran-Iraq War, and the Chaco War between Bolivia and Paraguay), finding that control of additional oil resources was not the main cause of aggression in the conflicts.

List of wars described as oil wars 

 During World War I (1914–1918), certain operations were planned specifically to secure oil resources.
 Chaco War (1932–1935)
 World War II (1939–1945):
 Oil campaign of World War II
 Oil campaign chronology of World War II
 Oil campaign targets of World War II
 Events leading to the attack on Pearl Harbor (1941–1945)
 Biafran War, also known as the Nigerian Civil War (1967–1970)
 Wars related to Saddam Hussein
 Iran–Iraq War (1980–1988)
 Gulf War (1990–1991)
 Gulf War oil spill
 Kuwaiti oil fires
 Iraqi no-fly zones conflicts (1992–2003)
 Iraq War (2003–2011)
 Rationale for the Iraq War § Oil
 Conflict in the Niger Delta (2004–present)
 Heglig Crisis, South Sudan–Sudan border conflict (2012)

See also 
 Petro-aggression
 Petrodollar warfare
 Petroleum politics
 Resource curse
 Resource war
 1973 oil crisis
 Iran–Saudi Arabia proxy conflict
 Territorial disputes in the South China Sea

References 

Causes of war
war
Economic warfare